South Campus station may refer to:

 South Campus/Fort Edmonton Park station, a light rail transit station in Edmonton, Alberta
 Durgabai Deshmukh South Campus metro station, a rapid transit station in Delhi, India
 University South Campus station, a light rail station in Salt Lake City, Utah
 University station (Buffalo Metro Rail), originally named South Campus station

See also
 South Campus (disambiguation)
 South Station (disambiguation)
 Campus station